is a professional Japanese baseball player.

External links

 NPB.com

1990 births
Living people
Baseball people from Hyōgo Prefecture
Japanese baseball players
Nippon Professional Baseball pitchers
Fukuoka SoftBank Hawks players
Hanshin Tigers players
Orix Buffaloes players